Jackson County is one of the 36 counties in the U.S. state of Oregon. As of the 2020 census, the population was 223,259. The county seat is Medford. The county is named for Andrew Jackson, the seventh president of the United States.

Jackson County comprises the Medford, OR Metropolitan Statistical Area.

There are 11 incorporated cities and 34 unincorporated communities in Jackson County; the largest is Medford, which has been the county seat since 1927.

History
Modoc, Shasta, Takelma, Latgawa, and Umpqua Indian tribes are all native to the region of present Jackson County. Prior to the 1850s, the Klickitats from the north raided the area.

The Territorial Legislature created Jackson County on January 12, 1852, from the southwestern portion of Lane County and the unorganized area south of Douglas and Umpqua Counties. It included lands which now lie in Coos, Curry, Josephine, Klamath and Lake Counties. Gold discoveries in the Illinois River valley and the Rogue River valley near Jacksonville in 1852, and the completion of a wagon road connecting the county with California to the south and Douglas County to the north led to an influx of non-native settlers.

Conflict between the miners and Native Americans led to war in 1853, which continued intermittently until the final defeat of the last band under chiefs John and George by a combined force of regular army and civilians May 29, 1856 at Big Bend on the Rogue River. The Native Americans had received the worse of the fighting throughout this conflict, and as they began to surrender, they were herded to existing reservations, beginning in January 1856 when one group was marched to the Grand Ronde Indian Reservation west of Salem. Over the following months, other groups were forced to leave until by May 1857 almost all of the Shasta, Takelma, and Latgawas tribes had been relocated to the Siletz Reservation, where they remained.

Jacksonville was designated as the first county seat in 1853. However, Jacksonville declined due to diminishing returns in the local goldfields and the construction in the 1880s of the Oregon and California Railroad. This railroad bypassed Jacksonville and instead went through Medford, located five miles (8 km) east of Jacksonville. Medford's prospects improved because of the location of the railroad and the accompanying commerce and development as Jacksonville continued its steady decline. Jacksonville fended off suggestions to move the county seat until 1927 when Medford was finally selected as the county seat.

In March 2004, Jackson County became the first of an eventual 35 counties in Oregon to implement a voluntary plan of fireproofing homes situated on properties zoned as part of the forestland-urban interface. This requires homeowners to maintain a 30' or greater firebreak around their structures, and affects 12,000 homeowners. In 2007, this plan becomes mandatory for many landowners, under threat of liability if their property is involved in a fire.

On May 15, 2007, residents voted not to reopen the county's 15 libraries, which had been closed since April 6 due to a shortage of funds. This was the largest library closure in the history of the United States. The libraries were reopened, with reduced hours, on October 24, 2007.

Geography

A portion of the Umpqua National Forest is in Jackson County.

Located entirely within Jackson County is Bear Creek and its watershed, a tributary of the Rogue River. The population centers of Medford, Ashland, Phoenix, Talent, and Central Point are located along the stream.  It connects with the Rogue River near the Upper and Lower Table Rock lava formations.

Adjacent counties
 Douglas County (north)
 Klamath County (east)
 Siskiyou County, California (south)
 Josephine County (west)

National protected areas
 Cascade–Siskiyou National Monument
 Crater Lake National Park (part)
 Klamath National Forest (part)
 Rogue River-Siskiyou National Forest (part)
 Umpqua National Forest (part)

Demographics

2000 census
As of the census of 2000, there were 181,269 people, 71,532 households, and 48,427 families living in the county.  The population density was 65 people per square mile (25/km2).  There were 75,737 housing units at an average density of 27 per square mile (10/km2).  The racial makeup of the county was 91.65% White, 0.40% Black or African American, 1.09% Native American, 0.90% Asian, 0.18% Pacific Islander, 2.88% from other races, and 2.91% from two or more races.  6.69% of the population were Hispanic or Latino of any race. 17.4% were of German, 12.9% English, 10.2% Irish and 8.8% United States or American ancestry. 92.7% spoke only English at home, while 5.6% spoke Spanish.

Of the 71,532 households, 30.30% had children under the age of 18 living with them, 53.20% were married couples living together, 10.50% had a female householder with no husband present, and 32.30% were non-families. 25.10% of all households were made up of one individual, 11.00% being a person who was 65 years of age or older.  The average household size was 2.48 and the average family size was 2.95.

The age distribution of the county's population was 24.40% under the age of 18, 8.70% from 18 to 24, 25.50% from 25 to 44, 25.40% from 45 to 64, and 16.00% 65 years of age or older.  The median age was 39 years. For every 100 females there were 94.60 males.  For every 100 females age 18 and over, there were 91.70 males.

The median income for a household in the county was $36,461, and the median income for a family was $43,675. Males had a median income of $32,720 compared to $23,690 for females. The per capita income for the county was $19,498. 8.90% of families and 12.50% of the population were below the poverty line, including 16.30% of those under age 18 and 6.90% of those age 65 or over.

2010 census
As of the 2010 census, there were 203,206 people, 83,076 households, and 53,460 families living in the county. The racial makeup of the county was 88.7% white, 1.2% Asian, 1.2% American Indian, 0.7% black or African American, 0.3% Pacific islander, 4.5% from other races, and 3.5% from two or more races. Those of Hispanic or Latino origin made up 10.7% of the population. In terms of ancestry, 19.9% were German, 14.4% were English, 14.1% were Irish, and 5.3% were American.

Of the 83,076 households, 28.7% had children under the age of 18 living with them, 48.4% were married couples living together, 11.0% had a female householder with no husband present, 35.6% were non-families, and 27.7% of all households were made up of individuals. The average household size was 2.40 and the average family size was 2.91. The median age was 42.1 years.

The median income for a household in the county was $44,142 and the median income for a family was $53,739. Males had a median income of $40,435 versus $30,632 for females. The per capita income for the county was $24,410. About 9.9% of families and 14.0% of the population were below the poverty line, including 19.0% of those under age 18 and 7.4% of those age 65 or over.

Communities

Cities

Ashland
Butte Falls
Central Point
Eagle Point
Gold Hill
Jacksonville
Medford (county seat)
Phoenix
Rogue River
Shady Cove
Talent

Census-designated places
Prospect
Foots Creek
Ruch
Trail
White City
Wimer

Unincorporated communities

Applegate
Beagle
Bitter Lick
Brownsboro
Buckhorn Springs
Buncom
Cascade Gorge
Climax
Colestin
Dardanelles
Four Corners
Lake Creek
Lincoln
McKee Bridge
McLeod
Mountain View
Persist
Pinehurst
Provolt
Rock Point
Rogue Elk
Sams Valley
Seven Oaks
Starvation Heights
Steamboat
Table Rock
Tolo
Union Creek

Former community
Copper

Politics
As is typical of southwestern Oregon, Jackson County leans towards the Republican nominee in presidential elections, although the presence of a substantial student body at Ashland means Democrats get a larger proportion of the vote in statewide elections than in any other county south of the Willamette Valley. No Democratic presidential candidate has won an absolute majority in Jackson County since Lyndon Johnson’s landslide in 1964, although Bill Clinton in 1992 and Barack Obama in 2008 obtained narrow pluralities in the county, in both cases by less than 500 votes. 

In the United States House of Representatives, Jackson County lies within Oregon's 2nd congressional district, which has a Cook Partisan Voting Index of R+11 and is represented by Republican Cliff Bentz. In the Oregon House of Representatives, Jackson County is divided between four districts, which are together represented by three Republicans and one Democrat (Pam Marsh of Ashland). In the Oregon State Senate, Jackson County is divided between three districts; the 2nd and 28th Districts, represented by Republicans Art Robinson and Dennis Linthicum, and the 3rd District, represented by Democrat Jeff Golden.

Economy
The county's principal industries are healthcare, agriculture, lumber, manufacturing, and tourism.

Soapstone, a substance used in art sculpture, is mined in Jackson County.

According to the Jackson County Board of Commissioners, by 2021 the main cash crop produced within the county was grows of illegal cannabis, with the board declaring a state of emergency.

Points of interest

Bear Creek Greenway

The Bear Creek Greenway is the area on both sides of Bear Creek running from Ashland to Central Point. The Greenway's most popular feature is the bike path which runs from Ashland north towards Medford. Eventually it will be a  paved link between Ashland and Central Point. The bike path is very popular with cyclists and skaters, especially during the warmer spring and summer months.

Bigfoot trap

What is believed to be the world's only Bigfoot trap is located in the Siskiyou National Forest in the southern part of the county. The trap was originally built in 1974 by the North American Wildlife Research Team (NAWRT), a now-defunct organization based in Eugene, Oregon to capture the legendary hominid Bigfoot (or Sasquatch) that is said to inhabit the forests of the Pacific Northwest. In recent years it has become a major tourist attraction.

Oregon Vortex

The Oregon Vortex is a roadside attraction that opened to tourists in 1930, located on Sardine Creek in Gold Hill. It consists of a number of interesting effects, which are gravity hill optical illusions, but which the attraction's proprietors propose are the result of paranormal properties of the area.

Pacific Crest Trail
The Pacific Crest Trail, officially designated as the Pacific Crest National Scenic Trail (PCT), passes through Jackson County.

See also

Beekman Native Plant Arboretum
Britt Festival
Mail Tribune
National Fish and Wildlife Forensics Laboratory
National Register of Historic Places listings in Jackson County, Oregon
Oregon Shakespeare Festival
Southern Oregon Land Conservancy
Southern Oregon University
Southern Oregon Speedway
Medford School District
Ashland School District

References

External links
Jackson County, Oregon
Jackson County Records 1853–1920

 
1852 establishments in Oregon Territory
States and territories established in 1852